An etymological fallacy is committed when an argument makes a claim about the present meaning of a word based exclusively on that word's etymology. It is a genetic fallacy that holds a word's historical meaning to be its sole valid meaning and that its present-day meaning is invalid.  This is a linguistic misconception, and is sometimes used as a basis for linguistic prescription.

An etymological fallacy may involve looking for the true meaning of words by delving into their etymologies, or claiming that a word should be used in a particular way because it has a particular etymology.

Occurrence and examples

An etymological fallacy becomes possible when a word has changed its meaning over time. Such changes can include a shift in scope (narrowing or widening of meanings) or of connotation (amelioration or pejoration). In some cases, meanings can also shift completely, so that the etymological meaning has no evident connection to the current meaning.

Ancient Greeks believed that there was a "true meaning" of a word, distinct from common use. There is evidence that a similar belief existed among ancient Vedic scholars. In modern days, this fallacy can be found in some arguments of language purists.

Not every change in meaning leads to an etymological fallacy, but such changes are frequently the basis of inaccurate arguments.

An example of a word which has greatly changed its meaning is decimation, which originally referred to reduction by a tenth, but now usually means a drastic reduction or complete destruction. To insist that only the original meaning is true is to commit an etymological fallacy.

One word with an unchanged meaning and a misleading etymology is antisemitism.  The form of the word suggests that it refers to opposition to  Semites, but when the word was coined in the 19th century, it specifically signified anti-Jewish beliefs and behaviors. Many peoples who are not Jewish were thought to be Semitic, and since the word Semite could thus also refer to someone not Jewish, the etymologically fallacious argument is made that antisemitism is not restricted to anti-Jewish beliefs and that opposition to other would-be Semitic peoples should also be considered antisemitism.

See also

References

Further reading
 
 
 

Etymology
Relevance fallacies
Genetic fallacies